Oklahoma Cyclone is a 1930 American pre-Code Western film directed by John P. McCarthy that is a forerunner of the singing cowboy genre. It stars Bob Steele in his second talking picture playing the title role and singing. The film was released by Tiffany Pictures. The film was remade as Song of the Gringo.

Plot summary
A cowboy pretends to be an outlaw in order to become a member of the gang that killed his sheriff father.

Al St. John sang "The Lavender Cowboy" (Music by Ewen Hail, lyrics by Harold Hersey) in the film.

Cast 
Bob Steele as Jimmy Henderson / Jim Smith
Rita Rey as Carmelita Carlos
Al St. John as Slim
Charles King as McKim / Black Diablo
Slim Whitaker as Henchman Rawhide
Cliff Lyons as Henchman
N.E. Hendrix as Henchman Shorty
Hector Sarno as Don Pablo Carlos
Emilio Fernández as Pancho Gomez

Production
John P. McCarthy was the director of Oklahoma Cyclone, and he and Ford Beebe were the film's writers. Trem Carr was the producer for Trem Carr Productions.

References

External links 

1930 films
1930 Western (genre) films
American black-and-white films
American Western (genre) films
Tiffany Pictures films
Films directed by John P. McCarthy
1930s English-language films
1930s American films